Walter Tucker may refer to:

 Walter R. Tucker Jr. (1924–1990), Mayor of Compton, California
 Walter R. Tucker III (born 1957), United States Representative for California
 Walter Tucker (Canadian politician) (1899–1990), Saskatchewan politician
 Walter Tucker (Church of the Universe) (died 2012), established Church of the Universe